Since 1981, there has been opinion polling on the Ronald Reagan administration to gather and analyze public opinion on the performance and policies of the Ronald Reagan administration.

After becoming president on January 20, 1981, Reagan survived an assassination attempt. CBS News launched their opinion polls with their first one showing 67% of Americans approving the president's job performance. Similarly, an ABC News poll showed Reagan's highest approval rating at 73%. His ratings by CBS remained above 50% until the United States experienced a recession and high unemployment in 1982. According to a Gallup poll, his lowest rating was 35% in early 1983. Headed into the 1984 presidential election, Reagan's ratings by CBS recovered, reaching 58% and higher throughout the next two years. However, in January 1987, Gallup revealed that his rating dropped to 49% as a result of the Iran–Contra affair. By December 1988, the near end of his presidency, Reagan's rating recovered again at 63%. Retrospective polls continued to show most Americans approving Reagan's performance.

Retrospective approval ratings

Presidential approval ratings

January 1989

1988

1987

1986

1985

1984

1983

1982

1981

References

Opinion polling
Opinion polling in the United States